Djorkaeff is a surname. Notable people with the surname include:
 Jean Djorkaeff (born 1939),  retired French footballer
 Micha Djorkaeff (born 1974), French footballer
 Oan Djorkaeff (born 1997), French footballer
 Youri Djorkaeff (born 1968), retired French international footballer, son of Jean